Rod Coelli (born 23 April 1955) is a former Australian rules footballer who played with South Melbourne in the Victorian Football League (VFL).

Coelli was recruited from Ardlethan Football Club in the South West Football League (New South Wales). He made three appearances late in the 1975 VFL season and then didn't play a single senior game in 1976.

He joined Sandringham in 1977 and was a member of the grand final losing team that year. In 1981, after 53 games for Sandringham, Coelli returned to his home state and signed with Albury. He won the 1981 Morris Medal, awarded to the "Best and Fairest" player in the Ovens & Murray Football League.

References

1955 births
Australian rules footballers from New South Wales
Sydney Swans players
Albury Football Club players
Sandringham Football Club players
Living people